Where Are All the Nice Girls? is the debut studio album by English band Any Trouble, released in 1980 by Stiff Records.

The album was produced by John Wood and the band gained significant visibility after featuring on a Melody Maker front cover and in a very positive article by Allan Jones.

Track listing
All tracks composed by Clive Gregson; except where indicated
"Second Choice"
"Playing Bogart" (Nick Simpson)
"No Idea"
"Foolish Pride"
"Nice Girls"
"Turning Up the Heat"
"Growing Up" (Bruce Springsteen)
"Romance"
"The Hurt"
"Girls Are Always Right"
"Honolulu"
"(Get You Off) The Hook"
"Name of the Game (Live)" (Benny Andersson, Björn Ulvaeus, Stig Anderson)

Personnel
Any Trouble
Clive Gregson - lead vocals, guitar, keyboards
Chris Parks - guitar
Phil Barnes - bass guitar, backing vocals
Mel Harley - drums
with:
Alison Tulloch, Diane Robinson - backing vocals

Reception 

Although the album did not chart at the time, it later achieved critical recognition. AllMusic said "more than 20 years after its release, Any Trouble's debut still sounds fresh, engaging, and exciting, packed with sharp tunes, clever observations". Record Collector called it a "sprightly debut" and "a worthy selection to spearhead the first wave of records heralding the label’s relaunch." Trouser Press, however, called them "a pub band five years after the end of that era, playing competent, melodic rock with no special character."

References

External links 

 

1980 albums
Stiff Records albums
Albums produced by John Wood (record producer)